Brandon Wong (born 16 September 1971) is a Malaysian born Singaporean actor. He was born in Malaysia. He is able to speak Mandarin, English, Malay, Cantonese.

Career
Wong joined Star Search Singapore in 1995 after graduating from Universiti Teknologi Malaysia. Although he did not make the finals, he was offered a contract by TCS (predecessor of MediaCorp) and entered the entertainment industry. He made his breakthrough in the long-running hit series Wok of Life, playing the late Asian comedian Wang Sha.

In Star Awards 2018, Wong was nominated for Best Supporting Actor for the drama, My Friends From Afar.

In Star Awards 2022, Wong won his first acting awards, Top 10 Most Popular Male Artiste and Most Hated Villain after 27 years in the career.

Personal life 
Wong became a Singapore citizen in 2009. He is married with three sons.

Filmography

Awards and nominations

References

External links
Brandon Wong on Mediacorp
Profile on xin.msn.com

Living people
Singaporean male television actors
Malaysian emigrants to Singapore
Singaporean people of Chinese descent
University of Technology Malaysia alumni
1971 births